The Casa Cuba is a gallery about Cuba in Bukit Peringgit, Melaka, Malaysia. The gallery was built in June 2007 in the former senior government officer's residence during British Malaya. An initiative of the Cuban embassy in Malacca, the gallery showcases various forms of art by Cuban artists, such as paintings, lithographs and ceramics.

See also 
 List of tourist attractions in Malacca
 Cuba–Malaysia relations

References 

2007 establishments in Malaysia
Art museums and galleries in Melaka